Lawnswood High School was a girls' grammar school in Lawnswood, north Leeds, West Yorkshire, England,  close to the A660.

History
In 1854 the Leeds Mechanics Institute set up a girls' school, The Ladies Educational Institution, at 4 South Parade, Leeds. It later moved to Queens Square, and the name was changed to Leeds Girls' School in 1868 when it moved to the Leeds Mechanics Institute (the building which now houses Leeds City Museum). In 1909 it was renamed Leeds Girls' Modern School, and at this time it was in premises in Willow Terrace.  

In 1932 the school moved to Lawnswood and took the name Lawnswood High School. It was to merge with its brother school Leeds Modern School, a boys' grammar school, in 1972 to form the school now known as Lawnswood School.

Notable alumni

 Prof Karin Barber, Professor of African Cultural Anthropology from 1999 to 2017 at the University of Birmingham
 Elaine Burton, Baroness Burton of Coventry, Labour MP from 1950 to 1959 for Coventry South
 Joan Firth CB, Chair of Bradford Health Authority from 1998 to 2000
 Catherine Bennett, journalist and commentator
 Esther Simpson, organiser of academic equivalent of the kindertransport, saving refugee scholars from Nazis

References

External links
 Lawnswood High School alumnae website

Educational institutions established in 1854
1854 establishments in England
Defunct schools in Leeds
Defunct grammar schools in England
Girls' schools in West Yorkshire
Educational institutions disestablished in 1972
1972 disestablishments in England